Somatochlora whitehousei, or Whitehouse's emerald, is a species of emerald dragonfly in the family Corduliidae. It is found in North America.

The IUCN conservation status of Somatochlora whitehousei is "LC", least concern, with no immediate threat to the species' survival. The population is stable. The IUCN status was reviewed in 2017.

References

Further reading

 

Corduliidae
Articles created by Qbugbot
Insects described in 1925